Coop Mega is a chain of supermarket stores throughout Norway managed by Coop Norge and owned by local cooperatives. The chain director is Stian Enbom Lysaker.

The chain brand was established by the cooperative NKL in 1987 as a refurbishment of Domus. The first outlet was located at Bekkestua.

In 2018 the chain held a 3.8% market share in grocery retail in Norway, a tied 9th place.

As of 2021 there is 70 Coop Mega stores throughout Norway, and the chain had a turnover of 7 247 million NOK.

References

Norwegian brands
Supermarkets of Norway
Coop Norden
Retail companies established in 1987
1987 establishments in Norway

sv:Coop Mega